The Citizens State Bank of Henry, located at Main and 2nd Streets in Henry, South Dakota, was built in 1905.  It is Early Commercial in style.  It was listed on the National Register of Historic Places in 1997.

It housed the Citizens State bank until 1926, and later housed the United States Post Office.

It is a two-story brick building with sandstone trim, and a flat roof with a parapet.  It has a one-story addition on its west side, added in c.1920.

References

Bank buildings on the National Register of Historic Places in South Dakota
Early Commercial architecture in the United States
Buildings and structures completed in 1920
Codington County, South Dakota